Minuscule 558 (in the Gregory-Aland numbering), ε 275 (in the Soden numbering), is a Greek minuscule manuscript of the New Testament, on a parchment. Palaeographically it has been assigned to the 13th century. 
Scrivener labelled it by number 525.

Description 

The codex contains a complete text of the four Gospels on 352 parchment leaves (size ). The writing is in one column per page, 20 lines per page. There is another division according to the Ammonian Sections (in Mark 231 Sections - the last in 16:9), but without a references to the Eusebian Canons.

It contains lectionary markings, incipits (notes on the beginning) in vermilion,  (liturgical notes), subscriptions, numbered , and pictures.

Text 

The Greek text of the codex is a representative of the Byzantine text-type. Hermann von Soden classified it to Ak, related to the Antiocheian commentated text (along with 534, 546, 573, 715). Aland placed it in Category V.
According to the Claremont Profile Method it represents the textual family Kr in Luke 1 and Luke 10. In Luke 20 it belongs to the group 1519, which stays closely to the family Kx.

History 

The manuscript was in the possession of Earl of Leicester at Holkham Hall until it was transferred to the Bodleian Library in 1981, by arrangement with H. M. Treasury and the executors of the 5th Earl of Leicester. It was added to the list of New Testament manuscripts by Scrivener and was examined by Dean Burgon.

The manuscripts was added to the list of the New Testament minuscule manuscripts by F. H. A. Scrivener (525) and C. R. Gregory (558).

The manuscript is now housed at the Bodleian Library (Holkham Gr. 115) in Oxford.

See also 

 List of New Testament minuscules
 Biblical manuscript
 Textual criticism

References

Further reading 

 

Greek New Testament minuscules
13th-century biblical manuscripts
Bodleian Library collection